Thomas Thewes (December 9, 1931 – September 28, 2008) was Vice Chairman of the Board of Directors (Emeritus) and co-founder of the Compuware Corporation along with Peter Karmanos and Allen Cutting.

Thomas Thewes was a co-owner of three hockey teams: the Carolina Hurricanes (NHL), the Plymouth Whalers (OHL) and the Florida Everblades (ECHL). He won the Stanley Cup with Carolina in 2006. He was also a benefactor to several philanthropic interests.

Thomas Thewes was a graduate of the University of Detroit. 

He and his wife, Beverly, resided in metropolitan Detroit; they have six children. 

He died on September 28, 2008, of leukemia.

References

1931 births
2008 deaths
Businesspeople from Michigan
Carolina Hurricanes executives
Deaths from leukemia
Hartford Whalers executives
Sportspeople from Detroit
Stanley Cup champions
University of Detroit Mercy alumni

20th-century American businesspeople